Lionize is an American rock band based in Montgomery County, Maryland. The sound of the band is rooted in hard rock and heavy metal, but they frequently experiment with varying sounds, such as reggae, dub music, go-go, and funk. The band line-up consists of Chris Brooks (Hammond organ, Rhodes piano, piano, synthesizer, clav, lead and background vocals), Nathan Bergman (vocals, rhythm and lead guitar), and Henry Upton (bass and backing vocals).

Tim Sult of the fellow Maryland-based band Clutch appears on several albums as an additional guitar player. Other collaborators include Neil Fallon and Jean-Paul Gaster of Clutch; David Hinds, Selwyn Brown, and Sidney Mills of Steel Pulse; Dean Fraser, J. Robbins, Eric Oblander of Five Horse Johnson, and Larry McDonald. The band signed to Weathermaker Music, a label owned and operated by the band Clutch and Jack Flanagan, and released Jetpack Soundtrack. In 2015 the band released "Alpha" EP and in 2016 "The Voyage" EP independently. They began recording their next full length entitled "Nuclear Soul" in January 2017 at the Magpie Cage in Baltimore with producers J. Robbins & Jean-Paul Gaster. "Nuclear Soul" was released in September 2017 & the band spent the better part of the next 6 months touring UK/Europe.

History

2004–2006

The band met while in middle school and high school and officially became Lionize in the summer of 2004. They started gigging heavily around the Maryland, DC and Virginia areas at bars, local venues and house parties. On October 26, 2005, the band opened for Steel Pulse at The Recher Theatre in Towson, Maryland. That evening started a long-time friendship between both bands which eventually led to members of Steel Pulse bringing the band to Jamaica to record the album Space Pope and the Glass Machine at Harry J. Studios in 2008. By 2006 the band had supported Steel Pulse, The Wailers, Yellowman, Groundation, Israel Vibration, State Radio, Fuel, Hoobastank, Jimmie's Chicken Shack, The Pietasters, Concrete Blonde, and The Bakerton Group throughout the East Coast of the United States.

2007–2011

In 2008, the band opened for H.R. and The Human Rights band, which culminated in the band opening for the Bad Brains in 2011 and 2012. The band began touring extensively throughout the United States and Canada supporting acts such as Authority Zero, Wino, Clutch, Ozomatli, Chali 2na, The Wailers and Steel Pulse. In January 2008, Steel Pulse musical director Sidney Mills invited the band to Harry J. Studios in Kingston, Jamaica, to make a reggae-infused album called Space Pope and the Glass Machine, which features a horn section directed by Dean Frasier and Sidney Mills. The album was recorded between Harry J. Studios, Boot Camp Studio (Digital Paul) and Portmore Studio 100 (Squidly Cole). The band was joined in Jamaica by Tim Sult on additional guitar. The album also features Eric Oblander on harmonica for the opening track "Space Pope" and Larry McDonald on percussion throughout.

The album was released on the Pietasters record label, Indication Records. In 2009–2010, the band was handpicked by Lee "Scratch" Perry to tour the United States as Perry's own backing band and support act. This led to group performing at several festivals, including Reggae on the Rocks at Red Rocks Amphitheater outside Denver, Colorado. These two years also included the band supporting Kylesa, Red Fang and the Saviors, Galactic, Sublime with Rome and CKY. In 2010, the band recorded and released the album Destruction Manual, which was recorded and produced by J. Robbins at Magpie Cage Studio in Baltimore, Maryland. It had a heavier sound than the previous album Space Pope. Destruction Manual features Tim Sult on guitar, J. Robbins on percussion and backing vocals, and Donnie Williams on percussion. In 2011 the band returned to the Magpie Cage to record the album Superczar and the Vulture with Robbins at the Magpie. This album continues to find the band experimenting with heavy riffs, dub and funk. Guest musicians include Tim Sult, Nadav Nirenberg and Jim Conti from Streetlight Manifesto The album was released on Tomas Kalnoky's "Pentimento" label. In the summer of 2011 the band was the only band to ever perform Bonnaroo Music Festival and the Vans Warped Tour in the same summer.

Discography
 "Danger My Dear" (2005)
 "Mummies Wrapped in Money" EP (2006)
 "Space Pope and the Glass Machine" (2008)
 "Destruction Manual" (2011)
 "Superczar and the Vulture" (2011)
 "Jetpack Soundtrack" (2014)
 "Run John Barleycorn Run" (split single with Clutch for Record Store Day 2014)
 "Alpha" EP (2015)
 "The Voyage" EP (2016)
 "Nuclear Soul" (2017)
 "Cyber Attackers" (7-inch EP 2018)
 "Panic Attack!" (2019)

References

External links

Rock music groups from Maryland
2002 establishments in Maryland
Musical groups established in 2002
Reggae rock groups
Reggae metal musical groups
American stoner rock musical groups